Russian political jokes are a part of Russian humour and can be grouped into the major time periods: Imperial Russia, Soviet Union and finally post-Soviet Russia. In the Soviet period political jokes were a form of social protest, mocking and criticising leaders, the system and its ideology, myths and rites.
Quite a few political themes can be found among other standard categories of Russian joke, most notably Rabinovich jokes and Radio Yerevan.

Imperial Russia

In Imperial Russia, most political jokes were of the polite variety that circulated in educated society. Few of the political jokes of the time are recorded, but some were printed in a 1904 German anthology.

A man was reported to have said: "Nikolay is a moron!" and was arrested by a policeman. "No, sir, I meant not our respected Emperor, but another Nikolay!" - "Don't try to trick me: if you say 'moron', you are obviously referring to our tsar!"
 A respected merchant, Sevenassov (Semizhopov in the original Russian), wants to change his surname, and asks the Tsar for permission. The Tsar gives his decision in writing: "Permitted to subtract two asses".

There were also numerous politically themed Chastushki (Russian traditional songs) in Imperial Russia.

In Pale Fire by Vladimir Nabokov, the fictional author of the "Foreword", Charles Kinbote, cites the following Russian joke:

A newspaper account of a Russian tsar's coronation had, instead of "korona" (crown), the misprint "vorona" (crow), and when next day this was apologetically ‘corrected,’ it got misprinted a second time as "korova" (cow).

He comments on the uncanny linguistic parallelism between the English-language  "crown-crow-cow" and the Russian "korona–vorona–korova".

Soviet Union
In the Soviet Union, telling political jokes could be regarded as a type of extreme sport: according to Article 58 (RSFSR Penal Code), "anti-Soviet propaganda" was a potentially capital offense.
A judge walks out of his chambers laughing his head off. A colleague approaches him and asks why he is laughing. "I just heard the funniest joke in the world!" "Well, go ahead, tell me!" says the other judge. "I can't – I just gave someone ten years for it!"
"Who built the White Sea Canal?" – “The left bank was built by those who told the jokes, and the right bank by those who listened.”
Ben Lewis claims that the political conditions in the Soviet Union were responsible for the unique humour produced there; according to him, "Communism was a humour-producing machine. Its economic theories and system of repression created inherently amusing situations. There were jokes under fascism and the Nazis too, but those systems did not create an absurd, laugh-a-minute reality like communism."

Early Soviet times
Jokes from these times have a certain historical value, depicting the character of the epoch almost as well as long novels might.

Midnight Petrograd... A Red Guards night watch spots a shadow trying to sneak by. "Stop! Who goes there? Documents!" The frightened person chaotically rummages through his pockets and drops a paper. The Guards chief picks it up and reads slowly, with difficulty: "U.ri.ne A.na.ly.sis"... "Hmm...a foreigner, sounds like..." "A spy, looks like.... Let's shoot him on the spot!" Then he reads further: "'Proteins: none, Sugars: none, Fats: none...' You are free to go, proletarian comrade! Long live the World revolution!"

Communism
According to Marxist–Leninist theory, communism in the strict sense is the final stage of evolution of a society after it has passed through the socialism stage. The Soviet Union thus cast itself as a socialist country trying to build communism, which was supposed to be a classless society.

 The principle of the state capitalism of the period of transition to communism: the authorities pretend they are paying wages, workers pretend they are working. Alternatively, "So long as the bosses pretend to pay us, we will pretend to work." This joke persisted essentially unchanged through the 1980s.

Satirical verses and parodies made fun of official Soviet propaganda slogans.

 "Lenin has died, but his cause lives on!" (An actual slogan.)
Punchline variant #1: Rabinovich notes: "I would prefer it the other way round."
Variant #2: "What a coincidence: Brezhnev has died, but his body lives on". (An allusion to Brezhnev's mental feebleness coupled with the medically assisted staving off of his death. Additional comedic effect in the second variant is produced by the fact that the words 'cause' (delo) and 'body' (telo) rhyme in Russian.)

 Lenin coined a slogan about how communism would be achieved thanks to the political power of the Soviets and the modernization of the Russian industry and agriculture: "Communism is Soviet power plus electrification of the whole country!" The slogan was subjected to mathematical scrutiny by the people: "Consequently, Soviet power is communism minus electrification, and electrification is communism minus Soviet power."
 A chastushka ridiculing the tendency to praise the Party left and right:
 The winter's passed,
 The summer's here.
 For this we thank
 Our party dear!
Russian:
 Прошла зима,
 настало лето.
 Спасибо партии
 за это!
(Proshla zima, nastalo leto / Spasibo partii za eto!)

 One old bolshevik says to another: "No, my friend, we will not live long enough to see communism, but our children...our poor children!" (An allusion to the slogan "Our children will live in Communism!")

Some jokes allude to notions long forgotten. These relics are still funny, but may look strange.

 Q: Will there be KGB in communism?
A: As you know, under communism, the state will be abolished, together with its means of suppression. People will know how to arrest themselves.

The original version was about the Cheka. To fully appreciate this joke, a person must know that during the Cheka times, in addition to the standard taxation to which the peasants were subjected, the latter were often forced to perform samooblozhenie ("self-taxation") – after delivering a normal amount of agricultural products, prosperous peasants, especially those declared to be kulaks were expected to "voluntarily" deliver the same amount again; sometimes even "double samooblozhenie" was applied.

 Collective farm
Q: How do you deal with mice in the Kremlin?
A: Put up a sign saying "collective farm". Then half the mice will starve, and the rest will run away.

This joke is an allusion to the consequences of the collectivization policy pursued by Joseph Stalin between 1928 and 1933.

 Soviet famine of 1930–1933
Q: What does it mean when there is food in the town but no food in the country?
A: A Left, Trotskyite deviation.

Q: What does it mean when there is food in the country but no food in the town?
A: A Right, Bukharinite deviation.

Q: What does it mean when there is no food in the country and no food in the town?
A: The correct application of the general line.

Q: And what does it mean when there is food both in the country and in the town?
A: The horrors of Capitalism.

This is another joke about how disastrous the consequences of collectivisation were on Russia's food supply, how Trotsky wanted to treat peasants harshly to uplift workers, Bukharin vice versa, and how capitalist countries were still faring well in spite of this.

Gulag
 "Three gulag inmates are telling each other what they’re in for. The first one says: 'I was five minutes late for work, and they charged me with sabotage.' The second says: 'For me it was just the opposite: I was five minutes early for work, and they charged me with espionage.' The third one says: 'I got to work right on time, and they charged me with harming the Soviet economy by acquiring a watch in a capitalist country.'"
 Three men are sitting in a cell in (the KGB headquarters) Dzerzhinsky Square. The first asks the second why he has been imprisoned, who replies, "Because I criticized Karl Radek." The first man responds, "But I am here because I spoke out in favor of Radek!" They turn to the third man who has been sitting quietly in the back, and ask him why he is in jail. He answers, "I'm Karl Radek." 
 "Lubyanka (KGB headquarters) is the tallest building in Moscow. You can see Siberia from its basement."
 Armenian Radio was asked: "Is it true that conditions in our labor camps are excellent?" Armenian Radio answers: "It is true. Five years ago a listener of ours raised the same question and was sent to one, reportedly to investigate the issue. He hasn't returned yet; we are told that he liked it there."
 "Comrade Brezhnev, is it true that you collect political jokes?" – "Yes" – "And how many have you collected so far?" – "Three and a half labor camps." (Compare with a similar East German joke about Stasi.)
A new arrival to Gulag is asked: "What were you given ten years for?" – "For nothing!" – "Don't lie to us here, now! Everybody knows 'for nothing' is three years." (This joke was reported from the pre-Great Purge times. Later 'for nothing' was elevated to five and even ten years.)

Gulag Archipelago
Alexander Solzhenitsyn's book Gulag Archipelago has a chapter entitled "Zeks as a Nation", which is a mock ethnographic essay intended to "prove" that the inhabitants of the Gulag Archipelago constitute a separate nation according to "the only scientific definition of nation given by comrade Stalin". As part of this research, Solzhenitsyn analyzes the humor of zeks (gulag inmates). Some examples:

 "He was sentenced to three years, served five, and then he got lucky and was released ahead of time." (The joke alludes to the common practice described by Solzhenitsyn of arbitrarily extending the term of a sentence or adding new charges.) In a similar vein, when someone asked for more of something, e.g. more boiled water in a cup, the typical retort was, "The prosecutor will give you more!" (In Russian: "Прокурор добавит!")
 "Is it hard to be in the gulag?" – "Only for the first ten years."
 When the quarter-century term had become the standard sentence for contravening Article 58, the standard joke comment to the freshly sentenced was: "OK, now 25 years of life are guaranteed for you!"

Armenian Radio

The Armenian Radio or "Radio Yerevan" jokes have the format, "ask us whatever you want, we will answer you whatever we want". They supply snappy or ambiguous answers to questions on politics, commodities, the economy or other subjects that were taboo during the Communist era. Questions and answers from this fictitious radio station are known even outside Russia.

 Q: What's the difference between a capitalist fairy tale and a Marxist fairy tale?
A: A capitalist fairy tale begins, "Once upon a time, there was...." A Marxist fairy tale begins, "Some day, there will be...."

 Q: Is it true that there is freedom of speech in the USSR, just like in the USA?
A: Yes. In the USA, you can stand in front of the White House in Washington, DC, and yell, "Down with Ronald Reagan," and you will not be punished. Equally, you can also stand in Red Square in Moscow and yell, "Down with Ronald Reagan," and you will not be punished.

 Q: What is the difference between the Constitutions of the US and USSR? Both of them guarantee freedom of speech.
A: Yes, but the Constitution of the USA also guarantees freedom after the speech.

 Q: Is it true that the Soviet Union is the most progressive country in the world?
A: Of course! Life was already better yesterday than it's going to be tomorrow!

Political figures
 Vladimir Lenin, Joseph Stalin, Nikita Khrushchev and Leonid Brezhnev are all travelling together in a railway carriage. Unexpectedly, the train stops. Lenin suggests: "Perhaps we should announce a subbotnik, so that workers and peasants will fix the problem." Stalin puts his head out of the window and shouts, "If the train does not start moving, the driver will be shot!" (an allusion to the Great Purge). But the train doesn't start moving. Khrushchev then shouts, "Let's take the rails from behind the train and use them to lay the tracks in front" (an allusion to Khrushchev's various reorganizations). But still the train doesn't move. Then Brezhnev says, "Comrades, Comrades, let's draw the curtains, turn on the gramophone and pretend we're moving!" (an allusion to the Brezhnev stagnation period). A later continuation to this has Mikhail Gorbachev saying, "We were going the wrong way anyway!" and changing the train's direction (alluding to his policies of glasnost and perestroika), and Boris Yeltsin driving the train off the rails and through a field (allusion to the breakup of the Soviet Union).

Lenin

Jokes about Vladimir Lenin, the leader of the Russian Revolution of 1917, typically made fun of characteristics popularized by propaganda: his supposed kindness, his love of children (Lenin never had children of his own), his sharing nature, his kind eyes, etc. Accordingly, in jokes Lenin is often depicted as sneaky and hypocritical. A popular joke set-up is Lenin interacting with the head of the secret police, Felix Edmundovich Dzerzhinsky, in the Smolny Institute, the seat of the revolutionary communist government in Petrograd, or with khodoki, peasants who came to see Lenin.

 During the famine of the civil war, a delegation of starving peasants comes to the Smolny, wanting to file a petition. "We have even started eating grass like horses," says one peasant. "Soon we will start neighing like horses!" "Come now! Don't worry!" says Lenin reassuringly. "We are drinking tea with honey here, and we're not buzzing like bees, are we?"
 (Concerning the omnipresent Lenin propaganda): A kindergarten group is on a walk in a park, and they see a baby hare. These are city kids who have never seen a hare. "Do you know who this is?" asks the teacher. No one knows. "Come on, kids", says the teacher, "He's a character in many of the stories, songs and poems we are always reading." Finally one kid works out the answer, pats the hare and says reverently, "So that's what you're like, Grandpa Lenin!"
 One day Lenin is shaving outside his dacha with an old-fashioned razor when a small child approaches him. "Grandfather Lenin," the child begins eagerly. "Buzz off!" replies the father of the Russian revolution. What a kind man: after all, he could have cut the kid's throat.
 An artist is commissioned to create a painting celebrating Soviet–Polish friendship, to be called "Lenin in Poland." When the painting is unveiled at the Kremlin, there is a gasp from the invited guests; the painting depicts Nadezhda Krupskaya (Lenin's wife) naked in bed with Leon Trotsky. One guest asks, "But this is a travesty! Where is Lenin?" To which the painter replies, "Lenin is in Poland" (the joke capitalizes on the title of the real film, Lenin in Poland).

Stalin

Jokes about Stalin usually refer to his paranoia and contempt for human life. Stalin's words are typically pronounced with a heavy Georgian accent.

 Stalin attends the premiere of a Soviet comedy movie. He laughs and grins throughout the film, but after it ends he says, "Well, I liked the comedy. But that clown had a moustache just like mine. Shoot him." Everyone is speechless, until someone sheepishly suggests, "Comrade Stalin, maybe the actor shaves off his moustache?" Stalin replies, "Good idea! First shave, then shoot!" / "Or he can shave."
 Stalin reads his report to the Party Congress. Suddenly someone sneezes. "Who sneezed?" Silence. "First row! On your feet! Shoot them!" They are shot, and he asks again, "Who sneezed, Comrades?" No answer. "Second row! On your feet! Shoot them!" They are shot too. "Well, who sneezed?" At last a sobbing cry resounds in the Congress Hall, "It was me! Me!" Stalin says, "Bless you, Comrade!" and resumes his speech.
 A secretary (in some versions Alexander Poskrebyshev) is standing outside the Kremlin as Marshal Zhukov leaves a meeting with Stalin, and she hears him muttering under his breath, "Murderous moustache!" She runs in to see Stalin and breathlessly reports, "I just heard Zhukov say 'Murderous moustache'!" Stalin dismisses the secretary and sends for Zhukov, who comes back in. "Who did you have in mind with 'Murderous moustache'?" asks Stalin. "Why, Josef Vissarionovich, Hitler, of course!" Stalin thanks him, dismisses him, and calls the secretary back. "And who did you think he was talking about?"
 An old crone had to wait for two hours to get on a bus. Bus after bus arrived filled with passengers, and she was unable to squeeze herself in as well. When she finally did manage to clamber aboard one of them, she wiped her forehead and exclaimed, "Finally, glory to God!" The driver said, "Mother, you must not say that. You must say 'Glory to comrade Stalin!'" "Excuse me, comrade," the woman replied. "I'm just a backward old woman. From now on I'll say what you told me to." After a while, she continued: "Excuse me, comrade, I am old and stupid. What shall I say if, God forbid, Stalin dies?" "Well, then you may say, 'Glory to God!'"
 At a May Day parade, a very old Jew carries a placard that reads, "Thank you, comrade Stalin, for my happy childhood!" A Party representative approaches the old man. "What's that? Are you mocking our Party? Everyone can see that when you were a child, comrade Stalin hadn't yet been born!" The old man replies, "That's precisely why I'm grateful to him!"
 Stalin loses his favourite pipe. In a few days, Lavrenti calls Stalin: "Have you found your pipe?" "Yes," replies Stalin. "I found it under the sofa." "This is impossible!" exclaims Beria. "Three people have already confessed to this crime!"
Roosevelt and Stalin are at the meeting. Roosevelt says, "One beautiful thing about America is that we have freedom of speech. That means that anybody can stand in front of the White House and say, 'Roosevelt is a piece of shit' and nobody would pay any attention." Stalin says, "We have freedom of speech in the Soviet Union, too. Anybody can stand in front of the Kremlin and say, 'Roosevelt is a piece of shit' and no one would bat an eye."

Khrushchev

Jokes about Nikita Khrushchev often relate to his attempts to reform the economy, especially to introduce maize. He was even called kukuruznik ('maizeman'). Other jokes target the crop failures resulting from his mismanagement of agriculture, his innovations in urban architecture, his confrontation with the US while importing US consumer goods, his promises to build communism in 20 years, or simply his baldness and crude manners. Unlike other Soviet leaders, in jokes Khrushchev is always harmless.

 Khrushchev visited a pig farm and was photographed there. In the newspaper office, a discussion is underway about how to caption the picture. "Comrade Khrushchev among pigs," "Comrade Khrushchev and pigs," and "Pigs surround comrade Khrushchev" are all rejected as politically offensive. Finally, the editor announces his decision: "Third from left – comrade Khrushchev."
 Why was Khrushchev defeated? Because of the Seven "C"s: Cult of personality, Communism, China, Cuban Crisis, Corn, and Cuzka's mother. (In Russian, this is the seven "K"s. To "show somebody Kuzka's mother" is a Russian idiom meaning "to give somebody a hard time." Khrushchev had used this phrase during a speech at the United Nations General Assembly, allegedly referring to the Tsar Bomba test over Novaya Zemlya.)
 Khrushchev, surrounded by his aides and bodyguards, surveys an art exhibition. "What the hell is this green circle with yellow spots all over?" he asked. His aide answered, "This painting, comrade Khrushchev, depicts our heroic peasants fighting for the fulfillment of the plan to produce two hundred million tons of grain." "Ah-h… And what is this black triangle with red strips?" "This painting shows our heroic industrial workers in a factory." "And what is this fat ass with ears?" "Comrade Khrushchev, this is not a painting, this is a mirror." (The joke alludes at the Manege Affair, Khrushchev's thunderous denouncing of modern art at an exhibition at the Moscow Manege.)

Brezhnev

Leonid Brezhnev was depicted as dim-witted, senile, always reading his speeches from paper, and prone to delusions of grandeur.
 "Leonid Ilyich is in surgery." / "His heart again?" / "No, chest expansion surgery, to make room for one more Gold Star medal." This makes reference to Brezhnev's elaborate collection of awards and medals.
Early in the morning Brezhnev looked at the sky and smiled to the sun. Suddenly the Sun said, "Good morning, dear Leonid Ilyich."  Amazed and happy, Brezhnev told the Politburo members that even the sun knew him and greeted him personally. The Politburo men were skeptical but kept their doubts for themselves. Toward the evening, Brezhnev said to them, "I see you don't trust my word. Let's go outside and I will show you!"  They walked out and Brezhnev said to the sun which was already low, "My dear Sun, good evening."  The Sun answered, "Go to hell, you old idiot."  "What's that?" Brezhnev shouted angrily. "Do you know who you are talking with?"  "I don't give a damn," the Sun said. "I'm already in the West, I do what I want!"
During Brezhnev's visit to England, Prime Minister Thatcher asked the guest, "What is your attitude to Churchill?"  "Who is Churchill?" Brezhnev said.  Back in the embassy, the Soviet envoy said, "Congratulations, comrade Brezhnev, you've put Thatcher in her place. She will not ask stupid questions any more."  "And who is Thatcher?" Brezhnev said.
An aide says to Brezhnev, "Comrade General Secretary, you wear today one shoe black and the other brown." "Yes," Brezhnev answers, "I've noticed it myself." "Why didn't you change?" "See, I went to change, but when I looked in the closet, there was also one shoe brown and the other black." This refers to Brezhnev's senility.
 At the 1980 Olympics, Brezhnev begins his speech. "O!"—applause. "O!"—an ovation. "O!!!"—the whole audience stands up and applauds. An aide comes running to the podium and whispers, "Leonid Ilyich, those are the Olympic logo rings, you don't need to read all of them!"
 Meeting a foreign leader at the airport, Brezhnev begins to read his prepared speech: "Dear and much-respected Mrs Gandhi..." ..." An aide comes running to the podium and whispers, "Leonid Ilyich, it's Margaret Thatcher." Brezhnev adjusts his spectacles and starts again: "Dear and much-respected Mrs Gandhi..." The aide interrupts him again, saying, "Leonid Ilyich, it's Margaret Thatcher! Look!" "I know it's Margaret Thatcher," Brezhnev replies, "but this speech says it's Indira Gandhi!"
 After a speech, Brezhnev confronts his speechwriter. "I asked for a 15-minute speech, but the one you gave me lasted 45 minutes!" The speechwriter replies: "I gave you three copies...."
 Somebody knocks at the door of Brezhnev's office. Brezhnev walks to the door, sets glasses on his nose, fetches a piece of paper from his pocket and reads, "Who's there?"
 "Leonid Ilyich!..." / "Come on, no formalities among comrades. Just call me 'Ilyich'." (Note: In Soviet parlance, by itself "Ilyich" refers by default to Vladimir Lenin, and "Just call me 'Ilyich'" was a line from a well-known poem about Lenin, written by Mayakovsky.)
 Brezhnev makes a speech: "Everyone in the Politburo has dementia. Comrade Pelshe doesn't recognize himself: I say 'Hello, comrade Pelshe,' and he responds 'Hello, Leonid Ilyich, but I'm not Pelshe.' Comrade Gromyko is like a child – he's taken my rubber donkey from my desk. And during comrade Grechko's funeral – by the way, why is he absent? – nobody but me invited a lady for a dance when the music started playing."
 Brezhnev is dying; a doctor and some politburo are present in the room. With his last breath, Brezhnev demands "Get me a priest!" and expires. Only the doctor hears this clearly. A politburo member asks the doctor what Brezhnev said. The doctor replies "Invade Afghanistan."

Quite a few jokes capitalized on the cliché used in Soviet speeches of the time: "Dear Leonid Ilyich."
 The phone rings, Brezhnev picks up the receiver: "Hello, this is dear Leonid Ilyich...."

Geriatric leadership
During Brezhnev's time, the leadership of Communist Party became increasingly geriatric. By the time of his death in 1982, the median age of the Politburo was 70. Brezhnev's successor, Yuri Andropov, died in 1984. His successor, Konstantin Chernenko, died in 1985.  Rabinovich said he did not have to buy tickets to the funerals, as he had a subscription to these events. As Andropov's bad health became common knowledge (he was eventually attached to a dialysis machine), several jokes made the rounds:

 "Comrade Andropov is the most turned-on man in Moscow!"
 "Why did Brezhnev go abroad, while Andropov did not? Because Brezhnev ran on batteries, but Andropov needed an outlet." (A reference to Brezhnev's pacemaker and Andropov's dialysis machine.)
 "What is the main difference between succession under the tsarist regime and under socialism?" "Under the tsarist regime, power was transferred from father to son, and under socialism – from grandfather to grandfather." (A play on words: in Russian, 'grandfather' is traditionally used in the sense of 'old man'.)
 TASS announcement: "Today, due to bad health and without regaining consciousness, Konstantin Ustinovich Chernenko took up the duties of Secretary General." (The first element in the sentence is the customary form of words at the beginning of state leaders' obituaries.)
 Another TASS announcement: "Dear comrades, of course you're going to laugh, but the Communist Party of the Soviet Union, and the entire Soviet nation, has again suffered a great loss." The phrase "of course you're going to laugh" (вы, конечно, будете смеяться) is a staple of the Odessa humor and way of speech, and the joke itself is a remake of a hundred-year-old one.
 What are the new requirements for joining the Politburo? You must now be able to walk six steps without the assistance of a cane, and say three words without the assistance of paper.

Gorbachev
Mikhail Gorbachev was occasionally mocked for his poor grammar, but perestroika-era jokes usually made fun of his slogans and ineffective actions, his birth mark ("Satan's mark"), Raisa Gorbachev's poking her nose everywhere, and Soviet-American relations.

 In a restaurant:
― Why are the meatballs cube-shaped?
― Perestroika! (restructuring)
― Why are they undercooked?
― Uskoreniye! (acceleration)
― Why have they got a bite out of them?
― Gospriyomka! (state approval)
― Why are you telling me all this so brazenly?
― Glasnost! (openness)

 A Soviet man is waiting in line to purchase vodka from a liquor store, but due to restrictions imposed by Gorbachev, the line is very long. The man loses his composure and screams, "I can't take this waiting in line anymore, I HATE Gorbachev, I am going to the Kremlin right now, and I am going to kill him!" After 40 minutes the man returns and  elbows his way back to his place in line. The crowd  begin to ask if he has succeeded in killing Gorbachev. "No, I got to the Kremlin all right, but the line to kill Gorbachev was even longer than here!"
Baba Yaga and Koschei the Immortal are sitting by the window in the cabin on chicken legs and see Zmey Gorynych flying low, cawing "Perestroika! Uskoreniye!" Baba Yaga: "This old stupid worm! Told him not to eat communists already!"
 Mikhail Gorbachev and his wife were on the train returning to Russia following a state visit to East Germany. After they'd been travelling a short while, his wife asked him: "Where are we now, Mikhail dear?" He put his hand out of the window and said: "We're still in Germany, dear." Several hours later, his wife asked him again: "Where are we now?" He put his hand out of the window and replied: "In Poland." Some time later, his wife asked again: "Where are we now?" Gorbachev put his hand out of the window and said: "We're back in Russia." His wife was curious; she asked: "How do you know where we are just by putting your hand out of the window?" He replied: "When I put my hand out in Germany, the people kissed it. When I put my hand out in Poland, they spat on it. And when I put my hand out in Russia, they stole my watch."
An old woman wanted to speak with Gorbachev. She wouldn't leave the Kremlin for days until finally Gorbachev agreed to meet her. As she walked into his office, they exchanged greeting, and she got to her point: "Sir, was communism created by politicians or scientists?" "Why, politicians of course" he replied. "That explains it," she said. "Scientists would have tested it on mice first."

Washington region committee 
 Ronald Reagan awakens, all cold. His wife asks:
- Ronnie, what happened?
- My dear, I've had a nightmare. It's twenty-sixth CPSU congress and Brezhnev says: 'Dear comrades, we have listened to reports about situation in Bryansk and Oryol regions. Now, let's listen to the First Secretary of Washington CPSU committee, comrade Reagan.' And you know what? I have not prepared!

"The Soviet Union is the homeland of elephants" 

In its declaration of national glories, the Soviet government claimed at various times, such as through Pravda publications, to have invented the airplane, steam engine, radio, and lightbulb, and promoted the pseudoscientific agricultural claims of Lysenko as part of Stalinist pseudohistory. This was joked about in the phrase "" from the early 1940s, sardonically claiming that the Soviet Union was also the birthplace of elephants. An anecdote from Andrei Sakharov includes "(1) classics of Marxism-Leninism-Stalinism on elephants; (2) Russia, the elephants' homeland, (3) the Soviet elephant, the world's best elephant (4) the Belorussian elephant, the Russian elephant's little brother."

The joke has persisted in the form of "Russia is the homeland of elephants" (Russian: .)

KGB

Telling jokes about the KGB was considered to be like pulling the tail of a tiger.

 A hotel. A room for four with four strangers. Three of them soon open a bottle of vodka and proceed to get acquainted, then drunk, then noisy, singing, and telling political jokes. The fourth man desperately tries to get some sleep; finally, in frustration he surreptitiously leaves the room, goes downstairs, and asks the lady concierge to bring tea to Room 67 in ten minutes. Then he returns and joins the party. Five minutes later, he bends to a power outlet: "Comrade Major, some tea to Room 67, please." In a few minutes, there's a knock at the door, and in comes the lady concierge with a tea tray. The room falls silent; the party dies a sudden death, and the prankster finally gets to sleep. The next morning he wakes up alone in the room. Surprised, he runs downstairs and asks the concierge what happened to his companions. "You don't need to know!" she answers. "B-but...but what about me?" asks the terrified fellow. 'Oh, you...well...Comrade Major liked your tea gag a lot."
 The KGB, the GIGN (or in some versions of the joke, the FBI) and the CIA are all trying to prove they are the best at catching criminals. The Secretary General of the UN decides to set them a test. He releases a rabbit into a forest, and each of them has to catch it. The CIA people go in. They place animal informants throughout the forest. They question all plant and mineral witnesses. After three months of extensive investigations, they conclude that the rabbit does not exist. The GIGN (or FBI) goes in. After two weeks with no leads they burn the forest, killing everything in it, including the rabbit, and make no apologies: the rabbit had it coming. The KGB goes in. They come out two hours later with a badly beaten bear. The bear is yelling: "Okay! Okay! I'm a rabbit! I'm a rabbit!"
 In a prison, two inmates are comparing notes. "What did they arrest you for?" asks the first. "Was it a political or common crime?" "Of course it was political. I'm a plumber. They summoned me to the district Party committee to fix the sewage pipes. I looked and said, 'Hey, the entire system needs to be replaced.' So they gave me seven years."
 A frightened man came to the KGB. "My talking parrot has disappeared." "That's not the kind of case we handle. Go to the criminal police." 'Excuse me, of course I know that I must go to them. I am here just to tell you officially that I disagree with the parrot."
The CIA wanted to send a spy to the Soviet Union and the spy that was selected had incredible qualifications. He was fluent in Russian, had perfect Cyrillic handwriting, had a vast knowledge of Soviet culture and mannerisms, could cook typical Soviet meals, and could keep up his act with a belly full of vodka. The mission was long-term infiltration of the Kremlin. The spy was dropped in a remote village where he approached a man and said, in perfect Russian, "Hello comrade, can you please tell me which direction is Moscow?" The man looked at him, and walked inside. Within minutes, the KGB was swarming the village and arresting the spy. While being interrogated, the KGB officials said "Quit the act, we know you are an American spy." The spy was baffled they (especially the man in the village) were able to tell so quickly, but tried to keep up the act for as long as he could. When he finally cracked, he said "Alright, alright, I'm a spy. I will tell you whatever you want, but please just tell me how you knew I was a spy because I devoted my whole life to perfecting my Soviet character." The official said "You're black."

Quite a few jokes and other humour capitalized on the fact that Soviet citizens were under KGB surveillance even when abroad:

 A quartet of violinists returns from an international competition. One of them was honored with the opportunity to play a Stradivarius violin, and cannot stop bragging about it. The violinist who came in last grunts: "What's so special about that?" The first one thinks for a minute: "Let me put it to you this way: just imagine that you were given the chance to fire a couple of shots from Dzerzhinsky's Mauser..."
 An English athlete, a French athlete and a Russian athlete are all on the medal podium at the 1976 Summer Olympics chatting before the medal ceremony. "Don't get me wrong" says the Englishman, "winning a medal is very nice, but I still feel the greatest pleasure in life is getting home after a long day, putting one's feet up and having a nice cup of tea." "You Englishman," snorts the Frenchman, "you have no sense of romance. The greatest pleasure in life is going on holiday without your wife, and meeting a beautiful girl with whom you have a passionate love affair with before returning home back to work." "You are both wrong," scoffs the Russian. "The greatest pleasure in life is when you are sleeping at home and the KGB breaks your door down at 3 AM, bursts into your room and says, 'Ivan Ivanovitch, you are under arrest,' and you can reply 'Sorry comrade, Ivan Ivanovitch lives next door'."

Daily Soviet life
Soviet police announced a 7:00PM curfew. At 6:30PM, a policeman notices someone outside and shoots him. His fellow policeman asks "Why did you shoot him? He had 30 more minutes until 7:00!" The policeman replied "I know where he lives, he would have never made it in time."
 About the American hot dog: "In Russia, we don't eat that part of the dog." Told by Soviet emigree Yakov Smirnoff.
 Q: Which is more useful – newspapers or television? A: Newspapers, of course. You can't wrap herring in a TV. (Variation: "You can't wipe your ass with a TV" – a reference to the shortage of toilet paper in USSR, which forced people to use newspapers instead.)
 "We pretend to work, and they pretend to pay." (The joke hints at low productivity and subsistence-level wages within the Soviet economy.)
 Five precepts of the Soviet intelligentsia (intellectuals):
Don't think.
If you think, then don't speak.
If you think and speak, then don't write.
If you think, speak and write, then don't sign.
If you think, speak, write and sign, then don't be surprised.
 A regional Communist Party meeting is held to celebrate the anniversary of the Great October Socialist Revolution. The Chairman gives a speech: "Dear comrades! Let's look at the amazing achievements of our Party after the revolution. For example, Maria here, who was she before the revolution? An illiterate peasant; she had but one dress and no shoes. And now? She is an exemplary milkmaid known throughout the entire region. Or look at Ivan Andreev, he was the poorest man in this village; he had no horse, no cow, and not even an ax. And now? He is a tractor driver with two pairs of shoes! Or Trofim Semenovich Alekseev--he was a nasty hooligan, a drunk, and a dirty gadabout. Nobody would trust him with as much as a snowdrift in wintertime, as he would steal anything he could get his hands on. And now he's Secretary of the Regional Party Committee!"

Some jokes ridiculed the level of indoctrination in the Soviet Union's education system:
 "My wife has been going to cooking school for three years." / "She must really cook well by now!" / "No, so far they've only got as far as the bit about the Twentieth CPSU Congress."

Quite a few jokes poke fun at the permanent shortages in various shops.
 A man walks into a shop and asks, "You wouldn't happen to have any fish, would you?" The shop assistant replies, "You've got it wrong – ours is a butcher's shop. We don't have any meat. You're looking for the fish shop across the road. There they don't have any fish!"
 An American man and a Soviet man died on the same day and went to Hell together. The Devil told them: "You may choose to enter two different types of Hell: the first is the American-style one, where you can do anything you like, but only on condition of eating a bucketful of manure every day; the second is the Soviet-style hell, where you can ALSO do anything you like, but only on condition of eating TWO bucketfuls of manure a day." The American chose the American-style Hell, and the Soviet man chose the Soviet-style one. A few months later, they met again. The Soviet man asked the American: "Hi, how are you getting on?" The American said: "I'm fine, but I can't stand the bucketful of manure every day. How about you?" The Soviet man replied: "Well, I'm fine, too, except that I don't know whether we had a shortage of manure, or if somebody stole all the buckets."
 "What happens if Soviet socialism comes to Saudi Arabia? First five years, nothing; then a shortage of oil." (Variation: "...then a shortage of sand.")

A subgenre of the above-mentioned type of joke targets long sign-up queues for certain commodities, with wait times that could be counted in years rather than weeks or months.

 "Dad, can I have the car keys?" / "OK, but don't lose them. We will get the car in only seven years!"
 "I want to sign up for the waiting list for a car. How long is it?" / "Precisely ten years from today." / "Morning or evening?" / "Why, what difference does it make?" / "The plumber's due in the morning."

The above joke was famously mentioned by US President Ronald Reagan multiple times.

Modern Russia

Boris Yeltsin
Boris Yeltsin presided over the gutting and selling of many government companies and a substantial increase in corruption, which became target for jokes.

A man drives up to the Kremlin and parks his car outside. As he is getting out a policemen hurriedly flusters over and says "You can't park there! That's right under Yeltsin's window!" The man looks perplexed for a second but then smiles and calmly replies: "No need to worry officer, I made sure to lock the car."
Q: What did capitalism accomplish in one year that communism could not do in seventy years? A: Make communism look good.

Vladimir Putin
"Putin is holding a press conference. The first journalist stands up:
– I am from the Washington Post. What do you say about the mass graves and the disrespect of human rights in Chechnya?
Putin:
– Next question.
The second journalist stands up:
– I am from the Daily Mirror. Is it true that there are concentration camps in Chechnya and that every day peaceful citizens are murdered in them?
Putin:
– Next question, please.
The third journalist stands up:
– I am from Süddeutsche Zeitung. Please clarify what is currently happening on the Strait of Kerch, if Tuzla is an isthmus or an island, and why Russians are building an embankment there.
Putin thinks for a moment, then looks at the first journalist:
– What did you ask about Chechnya?"

Many draw parallels between Vladimir Putin and Joseph Stalin: his opponents do it accusingly, while neo-Stalinists proudly. Many jokes about past Soviet leaders are retold about  Putin:
Stalin appears to Putin in a dream and says: "I have two bits of advice for you: kill off all your opponents and paint the Kremlin blue." Putin asks, "Why blue?" Stalin: "I knew you would not object to the first one."

From at least 2015, it is common in Russia to joke about the "battle between the television and the refrigerator (битва холодильника с телевизором)." This refers to the balance between state media and actual living conditions in Russia: whether state propaganda on TV is able to overcome the presence of empty fridges.

Following the start of the 2022 Russian invasion of Ukraine many jokes started to be circulated online about the war and the rather disappointing results of the Russian Army compared with the expectations set by state propaganda:

 "According to Putin the tiny Ukraine is no match for our huge Russia and military. What's the situation now?"/ "Russia has lost 15,000 troops, 6 generals, 500 tanks, 3 ships, 100 planes and 1000 trucks. Ukraine hasn't done anything yet."
 Under orders of the State Media Oversight Committee, the next edition of "War and Peace" will be retitled, "Special Operation and Treason."
 “We are now entering day  of the special military operation to take Kiev (Kyiv) in two days.”

See also
Russian jokes
East German jokes
Hammer & Tickle
Bald–hairy
Lenin was a mushroom
Radio Yerevan Jokes

References

Sources
 Emil Draitser, Forbidden Laughter (1980) 
 Christie Davies, Jokes and Their Relation to Society (1998) , Chapter 5: "Stupidity and rationality: Jokes from the iron cage" (about jokes from beyond the Iron Curtain)
 Contemporary Russian Satire: A Genre Study
 Laughter through tears: Underground wit, humor, and satire in the Soviet Russian Empire
 Is That You Laughing Comrade? the World's Best Russian (Underground Jokes)
 Rodger Swearingen, What's so funny, comrade? (1961) ASIN B0007DX2Z0
 Dora Shturman, Sergei Tiktin (1985) "Sovetskii Soiuz v zerkale politicheskogo anekdota" ("Soviet Union in the Mirror of the Political Joke"), Overseas Publications Interchange Ltd.,  
Jonathan Waterlow, It's Only a Joke, Comrade! Humour, Trust and Everyday Life under Stalin (2018)

External links
 1001 Soviet political anecdotes in Wikisource  1001 избранный советский политический анекдот
 A collection of Russian jokes 
 Political jokes about Tzars  
 Soviet Jokes for the DDCI
 William Henry Chamberlin, "The "Anecdote": Unrationed Soviet Humor",  The Russian Review, Vol. 16, No. 3 (Jul., 1957), pp. 27-34 

Russian language
Russian culture
Jokes
Russian humour
Russian political satire